Hoffmanina is a genus of millipedes belonging to the family Paradoxosomatidae.

Species:
 Hoffmanina gorongozae (Lawrence, 1962)

References

Paradoxosomatidae